Wilstorf is a quarter of Hamburg, Germany in the Harburg borough.

References 

Quarters of Hamburg
Harburg, Hamburg